The 2017 World Judo Championships was held in Budapest, Hungary, between 28 August and 3 September 2017 at László Papp Budapest Sports Arena in Budapest, Hungary. The announcement of the host city took place on 23 March 2015.

Medal summary

Medal table

Men's events

Women's events

Mixed events

Notable attendees 
Besides Prime Minister of Hungary Viktor Orbán, the tournament was visited by President of Russia Vladimir Putin, holder of the eight dan (black belt), and President of Mongolia Khaltmaagiin Battulga, World Sambo champion and President of the Mongolian Judo Association.

Prize money
The sums written are per medalist, bringing the total prizes awarded to 798,000$ for the individual events and 200,000$ for the team event.

References

External links
 
 Official website

 
World Judo Championships
World Championships
World Championships
Judo
World 2017
Judo
Judo
Judo
Judo